Trogoderma ornatum, known generally as the ornate carpet beetle or ornate cabinet beetle, is a species of carpet beetle in the family Dermestidae. It is found in North America and Oceania.

References

Further reading

 
 

Dermestidae
Articles created by Qbugbot
Beetles described in 1825